Sean Robert Berry (born March 22, 1966) is an American former professional baseball third baseman and current coach.

Early life
Berry was born in Santa Monica, California, and attended West High School in  Torrance, California. He was drafted out of high school by the Boston Red Sox in the fourth round of the June 1984 draft, but he chose to attend UCLA. He was drafted again in 1986, this time in the first round (ninth overall) by the Kansas City Royals.

Career
Berry played in the minor leagues until 1990, when he was promoted to the Royals after hitting .292 with 14 home runs and 77 runs batted in for the Double-A Memphis Chicks. He split time between the major leagues and minor leagues until 1992, when he was sent to the Montreal Expos as part of a multiplayer trade. Berry played between 103 and 122 games per year for the Expos  between 1993 and 1995, hitting double-digit home runs each season and batting .318 in 1995.

Before the 1996 season, the Expos traded Berry to the Astros for Raúl Chávez and Dave Veres. He was a member of the Houston Astros' original "Killer B's", along with Jeff Bagwell, Craig Biggio, and Derek Bell. He achieved career highs in 1996 with 132 games played, 17 home runs and 95 runs batted in. He played for the Astros through 1998, then spent time with the Red Sox and Milwaukee Brewers. His last year as a player was 2001, when he appeared in the minor leagues for the Toronto Blue Jays organization.

In 2003, Berry became a coach in minor league baseball for the Round Rock Express and then was the Astros minor league hitting coordinator before becoming the Astros hitting coach in 2006. On May 8, 2009, Berry went through a surgery to remove his cancerous kidney; he returned to the team three weeks later.

Berry served as the Astros' hitting coach until July 11, 2010, when he was fired and replaced with former Astros teammate Jeff Bagwell. At the time of the switch the Astros had an NL-worst OBP (.295) and SLG (.348). On September 9, 2010, the San Diego Padres hired Berry as their minor league hitting coordinator, replacing Tony Muser.

Berry was named as the hitting coach for the AA Jacksonville Jumbo Shrimp of the Miami Marlins organization for the 2019 season. He was hired by the Baltimore Orioles organization to be the Norfolk Tides hitting coach prior to the 2020 season.

References

External links

1966 births
Living people
American expatriate baseball players in Canada
Baseball City Royals players
Baseball coaches from California
Baseball players from Santa Monica, California
Boston Red Sox players
Buffalo Bisons (minor league) players
Dunedin Blue Jays players
Eugene Emeralds players
Fort Myers Royals players
Houston Astros coaches
Houston Astros players
Kansas City Royals players
Major League Baseball hitting coaches
Major League Baseball third basemen
Memphis Chicks players
Milwaukee Brewers players
Minor league baseball coaches
Montreal Expos players
New Orleans Zephyrs players
Omaha Royals players
Pawtucket Red Sox players
Sarasota Red Sox players
UCLA Bruins baseball players